The Best Female Golfer ESPY Award has been presented annually in two different periods to the  professional female golfer adjudged to be the best in a given calendar year. It was originally presented between 1993 and 2004, but was, along with the parallel Best Male Golfer ESPY Award, subsumed in 2005 by the Best Golfer ESPY Award. In 2009, the awards were again bifurcated by sex.

Between 1993 and 2004, the award voting panel comprised variously fans; sportswriters and broadcasters, sports executives, and retired sportspersons, termed collectively experts; and ESPN personalities, but balloting thereafter has been exclusively by fans over the Internet from amongst choices selected by the ESPN Select Nominating Committee.

Through the 2001 iteration of the ESPY Awards, ceremonies were conducted in February of each year to honor achievements over the previous calendar year; awards presented thereafter are conferred in June and reflect performance from the June previous. The award wasn't awarded in 2020 due to the COVID-19 pandemic.

List of winners

See also
Best Male Golfer ESPY Award
List of golf awards
List of sports awards honoring women
List of LPGA Tour leading money winners by year
Rolex Player of the Year Award
Vare Trophy

Notes

References

ESPY Awards
Espy award
Sports awards honoring women
Awards established in 1993
Awards disestablished in 2004
Awards established in 2009
Female golfers